Kaviti is a village in Srikakulam district of the Indian state of Andhra Pradesh. Kaviti mandal is bordered by Ichchapuram mandal to the north, Kanchili and Sompeta mandals to the south, Odisha state to the west and the Bay of Bengal to the east.

It is at a distance of 130 Km from the district headquarters.

Geography
It has an average elevation of 41 meters (137 feet).

Uddanam
The coastal belt at this place which presents a pleasant appearance covered with large extent of Coconut, Cashewnut, Jack and other fruit trees, is popularly known as 'Udyanam' or 'Udyanavanam' or 'Uddanam'. The area is a scenic spot and attracts visitors.

Demographics
 Indian census, the demographic details of Kaviti mandal is as follows:
Total Population: 	70,945	in 16,777 Households
Male Population: 	33,590	and Female Population: 37,355
Children Under 6-years of age: 9,996	(Boys - 5,120 and Girls -	4,876)
Total Literates: 	33,781

References 

{{Kaviti mandalam 
in Srikakulam district}}

Villages in Srikakulam district
Mandal headquarters in Srikakulam district